Dnyanesh Maharao (ज्ञानेश महाराव) is a writer and editor of renowned Marathi weekly magazine Chitralekha. He is in active journalist since 1 June 1989. Earlier he was Assistant Editor of Marathi weekly magazine Vivek, from 1 April 1985 to 31 May 1989. He has written more than 20 books in Marathi as well as in English. He has written a famous book: Thackeray : life & style.

He has also written two plays in Marathi: Jinku ya Dahi Disha and Sangeet Ghanlin Lotangan.

On the occasion of the 125th birth anniversary of Bal Gandharva and 130th anniversary of Sangeet Saubhadra, as a tribute to Annasaheb Kirloskar and Bal Gandharva, he has recreated Sangeet Saubhadra under the banner of Om Natyagandha Mumbai and presented it to the current generation to have a test of the old musical drama. He himself has played the role of Narad in this play.

He was a Festival Director for the 4th Annual "Maharashtra State Level Egalitarian Literature Festival" (समतावादी साहित्य संमेलन) which was held from 26 to 28 November 2011 at Latur Maharashtra.

Personal life 

Dnyanesh Maharao was born on 11 June 1960 in Mumbai.

Awards

Plays, dramas, theater

Bibliography

External links 
 Chitralekha Weekly Marathi Magazine चित्रलेखा साप्ताहिक 
 Mumbai Marathi Journalists Association – मुंबई मराठी पत्रकार संघ 
 Vivek Weekly Marathi Magazine साप्ताहिक विवेक

References 

Living people
Indian male journalists
Journalists from Maharashtra
Marathi-language writers
Indian magazine editors
Marathi actors
Writers from Mumbai
Indian male dramatists and playwrights
1960 births
Male actors from Mumbai
20th-century Indian journalists